Otito Ogbonnia (born August 25, 2000) is an American football nose tackle for the Los Angeles Chargers of the National Football League (NFL). He played college football at UCLA.

High school career
Ogbonnia attended James E. Taylor High School in Katy, Texas. He was a two-time all-district selection in football, recording 68 tackles, 24 tackles for loss, five sacks, and two forced fumbles as a senior. He also competed in track and field, winning state titles in both the shot put and the discus throw as a senior. He was also the top-ranked shot putter in the class of 2017.

College career
Ogbonnia won shot put gold medals at the 2019 USATF U20 Outdoor Championships and the 2019 Pan American U20 Athletics Championships.

Professional career

Ogbonnia was selected by the Los Angeles Chargers in the fifth round (160th overall) of the 2022 NFL Draft. He was placed on injured reserve on November 16, 2022.

References

External links
 Los Angeles Chargers bio
 UCLA Bruins football bio
 UCLA Bruins track and field bio
 

2000 births
Living people
Players of American football from Houston
American sportspeople of Nigerian descent
American male shot putters
American football defensive tackles
UCLA Bruins men's track and field athletes
UCLA Bruins football players
Los Angeles Chargers players